The HP Compaq TC4400 is a tablet-style personal computer. It can be used in the position of a normal laptop or the screen can be turned and folded down for writing.

Specifications
As with many manufactured tablets, there are multiple pre-configured models with various options, as well as the ability to customize a model. The following is a list of common specs on current models:

Pricing
As of November 2006, prices on pre-configured models range from US$1,449 to US$1,849. Creating a custom model can bring the price over US$3,000.

Notes

Further reading
 Laptop Magazine's Review
 Use of the Compaq at a suburban intermediate school

References

Compaq TC1100
Microsoft Tablet PC